Coombabah State High School is a public secondary school located in the northern suburb of Coombabah on the Gold Coast, Queensland, in Australia. Backing onto the Coombabah Lakelands Conversation Area, The campus is situated on Pine Ridge Road.

Overview 
The current principal is Chris Kern with the deputies being Justin Clinch, Cath Robertson, Tamerlane Schelks and PETA Purson. Over 1,200 students attend Coombabah High and feeder schools include Coombabah State Primary School, Biggera Waters State Primary School, Labrador State Primary School & Arundel State Primary School and also Helensvale State Primary School. It intakes students from the greater Gold Coast area.

It opened in 1986, with a student population of approximately 670 students in Years 8, 9 and 11.  Years 10 and 12 were introduced in 1987, and enrolments continued to grow, reaching a peak of approximately 1700 in 1989.  The first principal was Kevin Bowden, who was assisted by Carmel Gomm as Deputy Principal and Dorothy Dwyer as Senior Mistress. In 2011, Coombabah High celebrated its 25th anniversary.

Rugby League program 
Coombabah High is affiliated with NRL club the Canberra Raiders and the program is extremely strong at Coombabah.  The Rugby league excellence cohort is coached by Rod Pryor, Scott Marlow, Brett Timmis and former first grade Penrith Panthers winger, Rod Wright.  In 2007 the Year 9 team participated in the South-East QLD competition the Michael Hancock cup and reached the Grand Final, which was played at Suncorp Stadium as a curtain-raiser to a Brisbane Broncos match.  Coombabah lost to Palm Beach Currumbin High School. This year Coombabah participates in the Steve Renouf Year 8 competition, Michael Hancock Year 9 competition, Kevin Walters Year 10 competition and the Opens play in the Titans Cup, and Andrew Gee Shield. This year the Under 14s have won the Michael Hancock Competition for the first time. This year the school had six Queensland Representatives in Mitcham Ardler, Edward Brimelow, Jerremiah Nia, Nathan Wilson, Grant Davies (union) and Bryson Rukuwai (union).

Notable alumni

Media 
 Talitha Cummins, journalist

Sport 
Casey O'Neill, mixed martial arts
Scott Sattler, rugby
Jeremy Smith, rugby
Tim Smith, rugby
Thomas ‘Average Tom’ Body, (Sports Data Scientist)

References 

Public high schools in Queensland
Schools on the Gold Coast, Queensland
Educational institutions established in 1986
1986 establishments in Australia